Viennese may refer to:

 Vienna, the capital of Austria
 Viennese people, List of people from Vienna
 Viennese German, the German dialect spoken in Vienna
 Music of Vienna, musical styles in the city
 Viennese Waltz, genre of ballroom dance
 Viennese coffee house, the eating establishment and part of Viennese culture
 Viennese cuisine
 Viennese Actionism, a 20th-century art movement
 Viennese Opera Ball in New York, annual event that has been running since 1956
 Viennese oboe, a musical instrument
 Viennese Illuminated Chronicle, also known as the Chronicon Pictum, a 14th-century illuminated medieval document
  Viennese Thot, a thot from Vienna

See also